Syrnolopsis is a genus of medium-sized freshwater snails with an operculum, aquatic gastropod mollusks in the family Paludomidae.

Syrnolopsis is the type genus of the tribe Syrnolopsini.

Distribution 
This genus is endemic to Lake Tanganyika, which includes the countries of Burundi, the Democratic Republic of the Congo, Tanzania, and Zambia.

Species 
Species in the genus Syrnolopsis include:
 Syrnolopsis gracilis Pilsbry & Bequaert, 1927
 Syrnolopsis lacustris E. A. Smith, 1880 - type species
 Syrnolopsis minuta Bourguignat, 1885

References

Further reading 
 Mandahl-Barth G. (1954). "The anatomy and systematic position of the Tanganyikan snails Syrnolopsis and Anceya". Annales du Musée Royal du Congo Belge, 4°, Sciences Zoologiques 1: 217-221.

Paludomidae
Taxa named by Edgar Albert Smith
Gastropod genera
Taxonomy articles created by Polbot